Hanne is a feminine given name. Notable people with the name include:

 Hanne Blank (born 1969), American historian, writer, editor and public speaker
 Hanne Budtz (1915–2004), Danish politician and lawyer
 Hanne Darboven (born 1941), German conceptual artist
 Hanne Grete Einarsen (born 1966), Norwegian-Sami artist
 Hanne Harlem (born 1964), Norwegian politician
 Hanne Haugland (born 1967), Norwegian high jumper
 Hanne Hiob (1923–2009), German actress
 Hanne Hukkelberg (born 1979), Norwegian singer-songwriter
 Hanne Krogh (born 1956), Norwegian singer
 Hanne Liland (born 1969), Norwegian race walker
 Hanne Sigbjørnsen (born 1989), Norwegian blogger
 Hanne Staff (born 1972), Norwegian orienteering athlete
 Hanne Wolharn (born 1968), German actress

See also

 Hanna (disambiguation)
 Hanni (disambiguation)
 Hanno (disambiguation)
 Hannu (disambiguation)

German feminine given names
Norwegian feminine given names
Scandinavian feminine given names
da:Hanne